Ronald Ian Willis (born 27 December 1947 in Romford, England) is an English retired professional footballer who played as a goalkeeper in the Football League, most notably for Orient.

Career statistics

References

External links

1947 births
Living people
English footballers
Footballers from Romford
Association football goalkeepers
Charlton Athletic F.C. players
Leyton Orient F.C. players
Brentford F.C. players
Colchester United F.C. players
English Football League players
Arcadia Shepherds F.C. players
England youth international footballers